The caste system in the Maldives is the social stratification system found among the ethnic groups of the island.

The history of the stratification of the Maldivian social structure is not fully documented. However the French explorer François Pyrard de Laval, who spent five years in the Maldives following a shipwreck in 1602, wrote an account of the islands in the early 17th century and made reference of the existence of caste-like groupings (status-groups) in Maldivian culture. A basic summary of the early castes or caste-like groupings is seen from the writings of Carl Wilhelm Rosset (1887), the materials of J. Gardiner's trip, and a number of works by H.C.P. Bell. In his book The Reha, Ibn Batuta says that both the high and low castes of the Maldives all go barefoot as evidence of caste existence. Among the South Asian countries, caste system is mentioned to be in existence in Pakistan, Bangladesh, Nepal, Sri Lanka, the Maldives and Bhutan.

However, caste differences were never as common in the Maldives as they were in the other nations. The distinction between the nobility and the common people in society was given more emphasis in the Maldives than it was in the Vedic caste system. There are no longer any customary differences, and there are also no marital restrictions in the Maldive sociocultural pattern.

Maldivian society serves as an example of a social structure that has lately shed a lot of stratification related characteristics while still perhaps holding onto certain remnants of the former caste society. Intriguingly, the social groupings that make up the highest social class in modern society — the aristocracy, as well as low caste groups like the Raaveri—are where the most pronounced vestiges are found.

Perhaps the most impressive proof of the social hierarchy's importance can be found in the Maldivian language. It maintains a quite complex system of honorific degrees that unifies common speech with this intricate social stratification. Various forms have a variety of versions, which are chosen based on the social position of the dialogue's participants.

Account of caste system in 1885 
On visiting Malé in 1885, C.W. Rosset on describing a bed mentions that the material used in it differs according to the caste. The upper castes use brass chains, medium castes use iron chains, and low castes use coiled ropes to suspend the bed. For the bed's furnishings high castes use red silk for their mattresses and pillows, middle castes use cotton sheets, and low castes sleep on straw. The mat used to cover the straw mattress has a pattern and quality that are determined by the owner's caste. 

C.W. Rosset mentions that several times when he visited the lower caste homes, the women of the home would participate in the conversation while always remaining invisible in their home. 

Caste divisions were strictly upheld in Malé even during 1885.

Abolishment of caste system in 1968 
This caste system was completely eliminated after the founding of the republic in 1968; as of now, just a few of its remnants remain.

Segregation of caste 
Occupational segregation in Maldives where the island of a given craft was isolated to others, is distinctive proof of the persistence of caste.

The craftsmen like the weavers, goldsmiths, locksmiths, blacksmiths, mat-weavers, potters, turners, and the carpenters and others, are all situated in different islands. In other words, their craftsmen do not mix; each craft has its own island. And people have also adhered to this rule.

Men of the jeweler caste and trade live in the islands of Rinbudhoo, Hulhudheli and Nilande Atoll.  (toddy-drawers) live in Thakandhoo, Uligan, Berimadu, and Tiffardu, three of the Thiladhunmathi province's islands.

Surname and name structure 

Three parts make up the traditional Maldivian name, as examples Maakana Kudatuttu Didi or Dhoondeyri Ali Manikfan.

The surname was the first element, and the given name—or a word of affection like Tuttu, Kuda, or Don—or a combination of a term and a given name, as Kuda Hussain or Don Mariyambu—was the second element.

The third component, which was optional, signified status and/or cognomen via affiliation or birth.

Traditional birth ranks and cognomen included Manippulu, Goma, Kalaa, Kambaa, Rahaa, Manikfan, Didi, Seedi, Sitti, Maniku, Manike, Thakurufan, Thakuru, Kalo, Soru, Manje, and others.

The family surname was primarily patrilinearly transmitted. However, matrilinear transfer of surnames was not unusual. Which parent had a better social and economical situation determined this. The historically materialistic Maldivians would have given the children their mother's last name if the mother had more material possessions and better connections than the father.

Name inheritance 
In the service of kings and nobles, slaves were frequently promoted to important positions. Sometimes, the given names of their slave ancestors were adopted as surnames by their descendants. For instance, a family by the name of Yaagoot descended from a slave by the same name who worked as a slave for a Diyamigili sultan in the eighteenth century. An African Negro slave by the name of Heyna who belonged to Sultan Mohamed Imaduddine IV in the nineteenth century was the ancestor of a family by that name.

Offices and titles
Offices were more practical than titles and were not given to holders for life. The  held the highest positions.

The majority of the  titles and  positions shared names, with the only distinction being the removal of the  suffix.

Faarhanaa, Rannabandeyri, Dorhimeyna, Faamuladeyri, Maafaiy, and Handeygiri or Handeygirin were among the  offices.

However, there have been several instances of prime ministers who were either  or had no other positions.

Usually, the Dorhimeyna served as the military's commander-in-chief.

Vazirs 
The line separating the ministers from the  sometimes blurred in subsequent years.

The terms  and ministers were frequently used interchangeably, with  replacing the term  in ordinary speech.

The chief admiral and foreign minister was the Velaanaa (or Velaanaa-Shahbandar), the minister of public works was the Hakuraa, the chief treasurer was the Bodubandeyri, the chief of palace staff was the Maabandeyri, who was in charge of maintaining the royal seal known as the Kattiri Mudi, and the commander of the land forces was the Daharaa (or Daharada).

Division heads 
Below the ministers, there were a number of smaller positions, such as the Meerubahuru, who oversaw immigration and the port of Malé.

There was also the Faiylia, who was in charge of keeping records of public business.

Chief justice 
The chief justice was in charge of ecclesiastical and civil justice, as well as the maintenance of mosques, cemeteries, charity trusts, religious rites, and the approval of marriage and divorce.

He was also in charge of keeping the Tarikh, the official history book. The Bandaara Naibu, or the Attorney General, and the Chief Justice, shared responsibilities for criminal justice.

Governors 
The , or regional governors, acted as the sultan or sultana in the distant provinces ("atolls"). In the Maldive language, from which the word atoll has been borrowed, atoll refers to a province rather than a coral reef enclosing a lagoon.

The , who was (and is now) the principal temporal and spiritual authority, served as the sultan or sultana's representative on each particular populated island or settlement.

Malé's  were solely religious officials.

Gazi 
The  was in charge of administering criminal justice as well as civil and religious justice.

Each island had a  who served as the chief justice's representative and was in charge of maintaining mosques and graveyards.

Kilege 
The  was the highest honor bestowed by the Maldives' sultans and sultanas. The following titles have been bestowed throughout the previous four to five centuries of the monarchy: Ras Kilege, to both men and women.

All of the following  are solely available to men: Faarhanaa Kilege, Rannabandeyri Kilege, Dorhimeyna Kilege, Faamuladeyri Kilege, Maafaiy Kilege, Kaulannaa Kilege, Oliginaa Kilege, Daharada Kilege, Kuda Rannabandeyri Kilege, and Kuda Dorhimeyna Kilege.

Only Rani Kilege, Maavaa Kilege, Kambaadi Kilege, and Maanayaa Kilege were given to women.

Over the past several hundred years, the term  has acquired the optional and honorific suffix "".

The king-sultan or the queen-sultana were the ex-officio Ras Kilege.

Kangathi 
The term "" was a lesser title. These were frequently given to well-known regional figures or occasionally to Malé's middle class.

In contrast to the  nobles, the awardees were not recognized as aristocrats.

Maafahaiy, Meyna, Ranahamaanthi, Gadahamaanthi, Hirihamaanthi, Fenna, Wathabandeyri, Kaannaa, Daannaa, and Fandiaiy were some of the  titles.

No instance of a woman receiving a  title has been documented.

Ranks 
In normal use, this would have been prefixed with a cognomen designating status by birth; this practice was presumably carried over from the pre-Islamic civilizations' caste systems.

For instance, if a chief judge named Ibrahim had been born into the upper class, he would have gone by the names Ibrahim Uttama Fandiyaaru Manikfan and Ibrahim Uttama Fandiyaaru Kaleygefan. Regardless of his place of origin, he would have been addressed as Ibrahim Uttama Fandiyaaru, or the Subject Chief Justice Ibrahim, in all royal warrants, writs, and ceremonies.

The  were the exceptions to this rule; their names were solely prefixed with their , regardless of status at birth. The recipient and his or her family were raised to the ranks of the aristocracy by the  title, which transcended any status attained by birth.

Royals 
Members of the royal family had their names prefixed with Manippulu if they were princes, and Goma if they were princesses, or more frequently with nickname like Tuttu, Don, Titti, or Dorhy. The term "" was a new term.

Princes and princesses were both referred to as  until the early eighteenth century. A prince was really called Kalaa, while a princess was called Kambaa.

The royal (patrilinear) line of the governing family did not hold any public office until in recent times of monarchy.

Slaves 
Slaves made up a large portion of the Maldivian population by the 14th century, when one of the oldest accounts of the islands, recorded by the renowned Arab traveler Ibn Batuta, first emerged. Most of them were transported in Arab boats to the Maldives. Slave Africans settled peacefully in the northern and central provinces in general. Mixed marriages were not unheard of, and slaves frequently intermarried with the locals.

The anthropometric characteristics of the descendants of African slaves may still be seen among the native people, especially in the capital city Malé and in the northern provinces of Maldives.

Despite having certain anthropometric traits that indicated they were descended from Africans, slaves gradually assimilated into the community, mostly with the lowest castes. In sub-continental India as well, the phenomenon of (former) slaves blending with lower castes is not unheard of.

Baburu slaves 

Slaves of African origin were called , which meant negro in Maldives.

Slavery was well-known in the Maldives, first and foremost in the nation's capital Male and on the islands where sizable populations of the nobility resided.

Arab vessels carried the majority of the slaves to the Maldives. The majority of these routes for the slave trade began in East Africa and continued via Zanzibar and the Omani port of Muscat. According to reports, Sultan Hasan Ill authorized the purchase of a large number of slaves in the Saudi Arabian port city of Jeddah during the middle of the 15th century. This Sultan's unwillingness to allow a slave to be punished for killing a Maldivian is the reason he is referenced once again in the historical narrative Ta'rikh.

Slaves had access to a variety of occupations outside lower caste employment. Some of them worked in the Sultan's guard. Only Africans were essentially subject to slavery.

The number of slaves being sent to Maldives after the 18th century was drastically decreased, and by the start of the 19th century, the already meager supply of African slaves had all but vanished.

 Amina Fulu, who passed away in the 1940s, was the last first-generation slave of Maldives.

Charukeysi slaves 
Slaves from Eastern Europe were known as Charukeysi (Circasian).

Local slaves 
During the Middle Ages, several aristocratic families used local commoners as slaves and occasionally even sold them. During the rule of Sultan Mohamed Ibn Al-Hajj Ali Thukkalaa, the situation changed.

Fulhu 
Fulhu was a rank by affiliation. The name suggested ownership by a person of noble birth. In other words, Ahmed Fulhu as an example would be either a slave, a slave's ancestor, or a servant of the royal family.

Fulhu was the title given to those of the lowest status who joined the royal household for work or foreign slaves purchased by the great nobles and brought back to the Maldives from the slave markets of Arabia. Africans generally made up these slaves.

Low caste

Giraavaru people 
The most notable remnants of the old caste system may be seen among the few groups at the bottom of the social order. Giravarus is one such group.

Giraavaru people were compelled to leave their island in 1968. They were moved over to Male and housed in a few blocks on reclaimed grounds in the Maafanu neighborhood. They were assimilated with other social groups in Male'.

Raaverin 
Working primarily as Raaverins, or keepers of coconut plantations, the slaves were eventually absorbed by several social groups or castes, most notably the Raaveri.

Low caste names 
Names with suffix Kalo and Fulhu would be of lower class and would not have been welcomed in the presence of the monarch and nobility unless they were either servants or officials.

It is unlikely that a person with name suffix Kalo would have ever been permitted to enter the presence of royalty.

A name with suffix Maniku was lower middle class unless they inherited the name from upperclass.

Upper caste 
The complex social elite structure and the existence of the hereditary nobility are distinctive aspects of Maldivian society that also represent the remnants of a former caste system.

Despite being only fully visible in the capital, where the Sultan lived, the aristocracy was present in the southern Maldives.

Upper caste names 
If the bearers of names with suffix Seedi and Didi were married to royalty or Kilege nobles, or if they were Kilege nobles or descended from them, then their names may have been considered to be of a higher social class. Otherwise those with such names were upper middle class.

Names with suffix Didi or Manikufanu in the southern provinces were of nobility.

References

Further reading 
The voyage of Francois Pyrard The voyage of Francois Pyrard of Laval to the East Indies, the Maldives, the Moluccas and Brazil, v.1

Traces of castes and other social strata in the Maldives: a case study of social stratification in a diachronic perspective.

Maldives: Ancient Titles, Offices, Ranks and Surnames Maldives Royal Family

Caste